Graham Smith (born 13 January 1964) is an Australian cricketer. He played thirteen List A matches for New South Wales between 1985/86 and 1989/90.

See also
 List of New South Wales representative cricketers

References

External links
 

1964 births
Living people
Australian cricketers
New South Wales cricketers